The Silverton, Gladstone and Northerly Railroad was incorporated in 1899 after Otto Mears and associates were unable to procure financing to build a branch of the Silverton Northern Railroad to the mining area around the town of Gladstone. The railroad was chartered in 1899 by the Gold King Mining Co. to haul ore from the mines on Cement Creek to the Silverton smelters. It was 7.5 miles long and had .5 miles of spurs. It was leased by the Silverton Northern in 1910. (Mears leased the Silverton Northern in the same year and purchased the SN outright in 1915, although traffic was discontinued soon thereafter.)

Construction began from the mainline of the SN on the north side of Silverton, and followed Cement Creek northward to the town of Gladstone. At one time, an extension to the Silver Lake Mine was proposed, but no further construction ever was accomplished. The line served the Kendrick and Gelder (or Gilder) smelter, later run by the Ross Mining and Milling Co., the McKinley sawmill, the Boston & Silverton Milling and Reduction (Yukon Mill) site, the Anglo Saxon mine, the Mammouth Mine, the Henriette(a) mine, Fisher's sawmill, the Gold King mine and the Mogul mill.

Following the ups and downs of the metals markets, the SG&N was finally absorbed by the Silverton Northern Railroad in 1915, being operated as the Gladstone Branch. The line was dismantled between 1938 and 1942.

The railroad accessed the Denver & Rio Grande and also the Silverton Northern (at Silverton). As one of the shorter narrow gauge railways, the SG&N is an attractive railroad to model.

Roster 

 See link: http://www.drgw.net/info/SilvertonGladstoneAmpNortherly

References

Defunct Colorado railroads
Narrow gauge railroads in Ouray County, Colorado
Transportation in San Juan County, Colorado
3 ft gauge railways in the United States
Narrow gauge railroads in Colorado

Closed railway lines in the United States